Passchendaele was a battle honour awarded to units of the British and Imperial Armies that took part in one or more of the following engagements in the Great War:

 First Battle of Passchendaele, 12 Oct 1917
 Second Battle of Passchendaele, 26 Oct – 10 Nov 1917

These should not be confused with the battle commonly known as the Battle of Passchendaele, which is officially known to the British Army as the Third Battle of Ypres.

References

Battle honours of the British Army
Battle of Passchendaele